The Algeria women's national football team represents Algeria in international women's football. The team is currently ranked 76th in the world in the FIFA women's rankings. The team's highest ranking was 64th, in June 2009. The team plays its home games at the Stade du 5 Juillet in Algiers and is coached by Radia Fertoul since August 2018. Algeria played its first match on May 14, 1998, against France, and lost 14–0.

Algeria has never qualified for a World Cup. It has qualified five times for the Africa Women Cup of Nations, in 2004, 2006, 2010, 2014 and 2018, all finishing in group stage.

History

The beginning
The Algerian Football Federation was founded in 1962, after the Algerian Independence. It joined the CAF in 1963 and FIFA in 1964. By this time, no nation in the world had an official women's football team, instead they appeared in the 1970s. Algeria's first recorded match dates back on 1997. On 14 May 1998, the team played it first match against France in Cesson-Sévigné. The result was a heavy 0–14 defeat, which is still Algeria's worst result. Although the team was formed in 1997, a futsal team had played a game with Morocco in the same year, losing by 5–0.

In 2000, Algeria disputed its second game, facing Morocco in Casablanca on July 30, 2000, in a qualifier for the 2000 AWC in South Africa. They didn't score in the match and it ended in a 0–3 defeat. The second leg in Algiers on August 12 finished with a 1–3 loss. The aggregate score was 1–6.

The team was not registered on the qualifiers for the 2002 AWC, which took place in Nigeria.

In international competitions
In the 2003 All-Africa Games, as no qualifying took place, Algeria was invited to the first women's football tournament of the All-Africa Games, in Nigeria. The team was paired in Group B with 
South Africa, DR Congo and Mali.
The results weren't favorable as they lost all three games they played by crushing defeats. The first match was with DR Congo on October 4. The final score was a 2–5 defeat. Three days later, on October 7, they were beaten by South Africa with a scoreline of 1–3. Without any opportunity to advance to the Semi-Finals, Algeria played its last match with Mali and lost with a result of 0–3.

In the 2004 African Women's Championship, the Algerian women's team qualified for the first championship in their history when they participated in the 2004 AWC, again held in South Africa. Algeria's only rival in the qualifying round was Mali. Their road to the Championship started on the 11th of July, as visitor. They drew with Mali 2–2. Bowhani and Zerrouki scored for Algeria. At home, Algeria won 1–0 thanks to Zerrouki's goal in the 15 minute.
Algeria was drawn in Group B with Nigeria, Cameroon and Mali, who qualified as a lucky loser because both DR Congo and Gabon (who were scheduled to play together in the qualifiers) withdrew.

The team had its debut with Nigeria on September 19, but they couldn't surpass them, losing by the score of 0–4. The second game was with Mali on September 22, and they recorded a 3–0 victory, their only win in the tournament. Sedhane, Imloul and Naïma Laouadi scored for Algeria in this game. With a chance to advance to the Semi-Finals, Algeria played their last game, facing Cameroon. Algeria's Nabila Imloul scored the first goal of the match, putting the team ahead 1–0. But Cameroon scored in the 29 minute to equalize the game. The final result was a 1–3 loss, resulting in elimination from the tournament.

In 2006, Algeria was part of the only Arab Women's Championship to the date, held in Egypt in April 2006. Algeria was in Group B along with Lebanon and Morocco. Algeria had their best result of all of their games in the first match with Lebanon on April 19, when they won 12–0. The second match against Morocco on April 21, ended in a goalless draw. Algeria advanced to the Semi-Finals with 4 points.
In the Semi-Finals, the team won 3–0 against their neighbor country, Tunisia, thus advancing to the Final match, with Morocco. Algeria won 1–0 with a goal from Lilia Boumrar, and became the Champions of the only edition of Arab Women's Championship.

In the 2006 AWC/2007 World Cup qualifiers in March, Algeria entered into a World Cup qualifier for the first time as the 2006 AWC also served as the qualification tournament for the 2007 World Cup. The first scheduled rival for Algeria was Libya, but for unknown reasons Libya withdrew. Algeria advanced by walkover to the second qualifying round.
The second qualifying round rival was Northern Africa neighbors Egypt, who advanced to the Second Round by the withdrawal of Eritrea. The first leg, in Annaba on July 23, resulted in a 1–0 victory in favor of Algeria, produced by Zerrouki's goal in the 57th minute. The second leg was away, in Alexandria on August the 5th. Algeria defeated Egypt with a 3–0 result. The team qualified for the 7th edition of the African Women's Championship, originally scheduled to be held in Gabon, but ultimately held in Nigeria due to organizational issues.
The draw determined that Algeria would be in Group A along with hosts Nigeria, South Africa and Equatorial Guinea. The team didn't start well in the competition, as they lost the first game with South Africa 0–4. A worse result was registered in the second match, where Algeria faced the group favorites and 7-time champion of the tournament Nigeria. Algeria lost this match 0–6. The only point Algeria had in this edition was thanks to the last match, a 3–3 draw with Equatorial Guinea. Boumrar (one goal) and Bouhani (two goals) scored for Algeria in this match. Algeria failed to advance to the next stage and was eliminated from the 2007 Women's World Cup.

The 2007 All-Africa Games were held on home soil from July 10 to July 22. As hosts of the event, Algeria qualified automatically. They were drawn in Group B with Ghana and Senegal. They lost the first match with Ghana 1–2. They advanced to the Semi-Finals with a 3–1 victory over Senegal.
The Semi-Final was with Nigeria, and ended in a 0–5 loss. Algeria then played the third place match against Ghana. The game ended in a 1–3 defeat, leaving Algeria with a fourth-place finish in the tournament.

The 2008 African Women's Championship was the second AWC that Algeria failed to qualify. The team played the First Round with Morocco and won with an aggregate score of 3–1, winning both legs by 1–0 and 2–1. Algeria advanced to the Second Round with Tunisia. The first leg in away soil, ended in a draw with no goals and the second (at home) resulted in a loss with the scoreline of 2–1. Algeria was eliminated and Tunisia qualified.

In the qualifiers for the 2008 Olympic Games, held in China, Algeria participated in the qualifiers, but didn't manage to get it. In the First Round, the Algerian team won 3–0 in the first leg with Mozambique and achieved one of the biggest wins in the second leg, by 9–1. The team advanced to the next round in where they faced Nigeria and won by 1–0, but had a loss in the second match by 6–0. Algeria were automatically eliminated after the aggregate score was 6–1.

In the 2009 UNAF Women's Tournament, Algeria participated in the only edition of the UNAF Women's Tournament in Tunisia in November 2009. The team finished second after drawing with Egypt 1–1 and lost 1–0 against Tunisia.

In the 2010 AWC/2011 World Cup qualifiers, Algeria entered for the second time in a World Cup qualifying round in the Preliminary Round of the 2010 AWC, against Egypt, but it later withdrew for unknown reasons. They advanced automatically to the First Round, in where they were drawn to play with Tunisia. The first leg was played in home soil on 22 May, in Koléa and the final result was 1–1. The goal for Algeria came in the extra time from Naïma Laouadi. In Tunis on 5 June, Algeria got its revenge for the last year loss, having a 1–0 victory. The aggregate result was 2–1 in favour of the Algerians, and thus, they qualified for the 2010 AWC in South Africa.
In the Final tournament, Algeria's group was B, also the same of Equatorial Guinea, Cameroon and Ghana. The opening match with Ghana, resulted in 2–1 defeat, with the only goal being scored Ouadah at the first four mins. The team was winning 1–0 in the half-time. The second game, with the 2008 Champion Equatorial Guinea, finished in a 1–0 loss. With no chances of qualifying to the next round, Algeria's closing match was against Cameroon, and this last result was a 2–1 defeat. Naima Bouhani scored the only goal for them. The half-time had a 0–0 draw. Algeria ended eliminated from both the 2010 AWC and the 2011 World Cup.

In the 2011 All-Africa Games, Algeria entered the 2011 All-Africa Games football tournament qualifiers, but did not play any match as it was the only entry from the Zone 1 (North Africa). In the final tournament, the team was in the Group A, with Cameroon, Guinea and Mozambique. The first match had no goals from part of Algeria, but three of Cameroon, that did one defeat to them. Algeria beat Mozambique by 7–1 with goals of Meflah, Bouhani, Bekhedda, Marek and Yahi. The team did not play the game against Guinea, because it withdrew prior to playing the first match. Algeria advanced to the Semi-Finals, in where they lost with Ghana by the score of 3–0. The match for the bronze medal was the first victory to South Africa by 3–0. Zerrouki, Bouhani and Marek scored for Algeria and gave them the bronze medal.

In the 2014 AWC/2015 World Cup qualifiers, after not entering the 2012 African Women's Football Championship qualification, Algeria registered in the 2014 qualifiers. This time, their rival was Morocco. In the first leg in Stade Omar Hamadi, Naima Bouhani shined for contributing to victory with 2 goals. Algeria defeated its neighbor country by 2–0. The second leg in Rabat resulted in a goalless draw. The aggregate result was 2–0, that made Algeria advance to the Second Round.
Again in Stade Omar Hamadi, Algiers; Algeria received Tunisia in a chance to qualify to their fourth tournament. The goals of both teams were scored in the first time. The score was 2–1 in favour of the Algerians. Laifa and captain Sekouane scored. In Stade 15 Octobre, away soil; Algeria faced an aspirant Tunisia that tied the game in the half-time 2–2. Sekouane's goal at the 81 mins. put the match 3–2. Algeria qualified again with an aggregate score of 5–3.
The draw on 19 July 2014 in Windhoek, Namibia (host nation) indicated that Algeria would be in the Group B with South Africa, Cameroon and Ghana. This was the second time in a row that Algeria was in the same group as Cameroon and Ghana. The first match marked the second win (and first) of the Algerian team in the tournament in 10 years (the last being the 3–0 to Mali in 2004), against Ghana with a 1–0 from Affak near to the end of the game. In the second game, they lost 2–0 to Cameroon. The last result, against South Africa, wasn't very good, as they lost by 5–1. Houria Affak again scored for the national team. All of its games were played on the Independence Stadium in Windhoek. Once more, Algeria didn't reached the World Cup.

Background and development
Women's football teams in the country have had to deal with killings around their matches.

Team image

Kits and crest

Kit suppliers

1st Kit

2nd Kit

Home stadium
The Algeria women's national football team plays their home matches on the Stade du 5 Juillet.

Results and fixtures

 
The following is a list of match results in the last 12 months, as well as any future matches that have been scheduled.

Legend

2023

Coaching staff

Current coaching staff

Manager history

Players

Current squad
 The following 33 players were called up for Training camp.
 Training camp dates: 14–21 February 2023
 Caps and goals correct as of: 19 November 2022, after the match against

Recent call-ups
The following players have also been called up to the Algeria squad within the last 12 months.
 

INJ Player withdrew from the squad due to an injury.
PRE Preliminary squad.
SUS Player is serving a suspension.
WD Player withdrew for personal reasons.

Previous squads
Africa Women Cup of Nations

2010 African Women's Championship squad
2014 African Women's Championship squad
2018 Africa Women Cup of Nations squad
UNAF Women's Tournament
2020 UNAF Women's Tournament squad
Arab Women's Cup
2021 Arab Women's Cup squad

Records

*Active players in bold, statistics correct as of 25 August 2021.

Most appearances

Top goalscorers

Competitive record

FIFA Women's World Cup

Olympic Games

Women's Africa Cup of Nations

African Games

 Tournament open to the national U-20 teams

UNAF Women's Tournament

Arab Women's Cup

Honours
African Games
 Bronze medal: (1): (2011)
UNAF Women's Tournament
 Runners-up: (1): (2009)
Arab Women's Cup
 Champions: (1): (2006)

All−time record against FIFA recognized nations
The list shown below shows the Morocco national football team all−time international record against opposing nations.*As of xxxxxx after match against  xxxx.Key

Record per opponent*As ofxxxxx after match against  xxxxx.''
Key

The following table shows Sudan's all-time official international record per opponent:

See also

Sport in Algeria
Football in Algeria
Women's football in Algeria
Algeria women's national under-20 football team
Algeria women's national under-17 football team
Algeria men's national football team

Notes

References

External links
Official website, FAF.dz 
FIFA profile

َArabic women's national association football teams
 
African women's national association football teams
national